Live from Austin, TX is a 2010 video album by R.E.M. recorded on March 13, 2008 (18 days before the release of Accelerate) for the television series Austin City Limits. The television broadcast aired on PBS starting March 24, 2008.

The DVD includes three songs not broadcast on the television program—"So. Central Rain (I'm Sorry)", "Fall on Me", and "Imitation of Life"; the live performance also featured "Final Straw", "Walk Unafraid", and an alternate version of "Supernatural Superserious".

Track listing
All songs written by Peter Buck, Mike Mills, and Michael Stipe, except where noted.
"Living Well Is the Best Revenge" – 3:24
"Man-Sized Wreath" – 3:01
"Drive" (Bill Berry, Buck, Mills, Stipe) – 5:04
"So. Central Rain" (Berry, Buck, Mills, Stipe) – 3:39
"Accelerate" – 3:47
"Fall on Me" (Berry, Buck, Mills, Stipe) – 3:07
"Hollow Man" – 3:20
"Electrolite" (Berry, Buck, Mills, Stipe) – 4:55
"Houston" – 3:07
"Supernatural Superserious" – 3:32
"Bad Day" (Berry, Buck, Mills, Stipe) – 4:40
"Losing My Religion" (Berry, Buck, Mills, Stipe) – 4:46
"I'm Gonna DJ" – 2:31
"Horse to Water" – 3:38
"Imitation of Life" – 5:21
"Until the Day Is Done" – 5:40
"Man on the Moon" (Berry, Buck, Mills, Stipe) – 6:30
Tracks 1, 2, 5, 7, 9, 10, 13, 14, 16 all taken from Accelerate.

Reception

The album received mixed and positive reviews.

Personnel
R.E.M.
Peter Buck – guitar
Mike Mills – bass guitar, backing vocals, keyboards, piano
Michael Stipe – vocals

Additional musicians
Scott McCaughey – guitar, keyboards, backing vocals
Bill Rieflin – drums, percussion

See also

List of Austin City Limits performers

References

External links
Press release from R.E.M.'s site
Video preview from New West Records' site

2010 live albums
2010 video albums
Austin City Limits
Concert films
Live video albums
New West Records live albums
New West Records video albums
R.E.M. live albums
R.E.M. video albums